Brighton Girls, formerly Brighton and Hove High School, is a private day school for girls aged 4 to 18 in the city of Brighton and Hove, East Sussex, England and is part of the Girls' Day School Trust

Brighton Girls GDST is ISI rated ‘Excellent’. The school was founded in 1876 and has 450 pupils. The school has a Prep School (Early Years, Key stages 1 & 2), High and Sixth Form, making it the only all-through girls’ school in Brighton.

Brighton Girls is one of the schools of the GDST (Girls' Day School Trust). Its main site is at Montpelier Road and includes the Temple building in the Montpelier area of the city with the Prep School opposite on Temple Gardens. In addition to netball courts, sports hall, gym and dance studio, the school also has its Astroturf playing field and further sports facilities on nearby Radinden Manor Road.

The Head of Brighton Girls is Rosie McColl, who started in the autumn term of 2019.

The Good Schools Guide describes Brighton Girls as a school that  is “certain of its own value and ethos, with individual encouragement producing fantastic results and grounded girls”.

History

Brighton Girls School is the seventh oldest school founded under the Girls' Day School Trust (1876). Its founders had radical ideas about education for women. The school founders' names are now used as the houses, Stanley, Lyttleton, Grey and Gurney. Their Latin motto is translated as "Truth is the way".

Academics
Entrance examinations consist of: 11 + Maths, English & VR; 13+ Maths, English, Science, MFL; 16+ Minimum of 5 GCSE passes (including English Language & Maths) with 8/7 s in subjects to be pursued; applicants are also interviewed.

Pupils can take part in a number of societies and extra-curricular activities. School pupils are divided into four Houses: Grey, Gurney, Lyttelton and Stanley; the Houses compete in a series of events and competitions to earn points, which go towards the House Cup, also known as the Banfora Cup, at the end of each academic year.

In 2021, 26 per cent of the school's GCSE grades were grade 9, the highest, and another 26 per cent were grade 8.

Creativity
Since 2018, the school has had an artist-in-residence, Crimson Trebar, and has held open houses and art displays.

The school has had a resident dance company, Penny & Jules Youth Dance, for many years. This company, alongside the school's own dance clubs and groups, works towards the annual dance show, 'Momentum', which is held at the Old Market in Brighton.

Rebranding
The school underwent a rebranding in late 2019, including the change of name (from 'Brighton and Hove High School' to 'Brighton Girls'), as a well as an updated logo.

Notable former pupils

 Karen Barber, ice dancer
 Alexandra Bastedo, actress
 Blanche Baughan, poet, writer, penal reformer
 Jasmine Birtles, financial and business journalist, author and presenter
 Elizabeth Beresford, creator of The Wombles
 Rosemary Coogan, astrophysicist, astronaut
 Beth Cordingly, actress
 Helen David, artist
 Rosa Dean, Senior Circuit Judge 
 Grace Eyre Woodhead, Philanthropist, pioneer of disability rights and mental health care
 Constance Garnett, translator
 Sally Greengross, equality campaigner, politician 
 Louise Gullifer, Professor of English Law
 Margaret Joachim, politician and campaigner 
 Martha Kearney, journalist
 Amy Levy, poet and writer
 Theodora Lisle Prankerd, botanist
 Ida Lupino, actress
 Louisa Martindale, surgeon
 Hilda Martindale, British civil servant and author
 Suzy Menkes, Editor of the International Herald Tribune, journalist
 Gwenda Morgan, artist
 Maureen Muggeridge, geologist and gemologist
 Geraldine Newman, actress
 Lindsay Northover, Baroness Northover, politician
 Karen Pickering, swimmer
 Estelle Rowe, engineer, STEM campaigner
 Kalea Stagg, netballer
 Frances Stead Sellers, journalist
 Rebecca Stott, author 
 Faynia Williams, international director, BBC Producer of drama and documentaries
 Fiona Murray, Dame Fiona Elizabeth Murray DCMG CBE is the Associate Dean for Innovation at the MIT Sloan School of Management
 Theodora Lisle Prankerd, British botanist who worked on the growth of ferns, and lectured at Bedford College and the University of Reading

Notable staff
Gabrielle Lambrick (1913-1968), civil servant, educator and historian taught at the school.

See also
Grade II listed buildings in Brighton and Hove: A–B

References

External links
Official website
Profile on the Independent Schools Council website

Private schools in Brighton and Hove
Girls' schools in East Sussex
Educational institutions established in 1876
Schools of the Girls' Day School Trust
Member schools of the Girls' Schools Association
Grade II listed buildings in Brighton and Hove
1876 establishments in England